Chanti is a 2004 Indian Telugu action drama film. The film stars Ravi Teja and Charmme Kaur in lead roles. The film was directed by Sobhan and produced by Krishna Kishore. The film's music was composed by Sri. The film was released on 12 November 2004. This film was Sobhan's last film as a director before his death in 2008.

Plot summary
Chanti (Ravi Teja), a soldier, arrives at his village for his father Madhav Rao's (Ranganath) funeral. He is bequeathed a huge property which he plans to use for his blind sister Jyothi (Revathi) to get her married. Unfortunately, the land happens to be between two proposed sites for a road in which the local MLA Sarvarayudu (Atul Kulkarni) has an interest, as it leads to his sugar factory. He offers to buy it from Chanti, who refuses, citing it as a memorial of his father. Chanti's sister is married to Raja Ravindra (Raja Ravindra), Chanti's army friend. However, the MLA kills Raja. Later, Chanti avenges his friend's and father's deaths, protecting his father's memorial site.

Cast

Soundtrack

References

External links

2000s Telugu-language films
2004 films
Indian action drama films
2000s masala films
2004 action drama films
Films directed by Sobhan